"Sun Goes Down" is a song by French producer David Guetta and Dutch duo Showtek, featuring vocals from Canadian reggae fusion band MAGIC! and Dutch singer Sonny Wilson. This is the second collaboration of Guetta with Showtek since "Bad" in 2014, and at the same time the second collaboration of Showtek and Sonny Wilson after "Booyah" in 2013. It was released as the fifth official single from Guetta's sixth studio album, Listen (2014).

Track listing
Digital Remixes EP
"Sun Goes Down" (Extended) – 4:18		
"Sun Goes Down" (Summer Remix) – 4:11		
"Sun Goes Down" (Eva Shaw Remix) – 4:17		
"Sun Goes Down" (Hugel Remix) – 4:33		
"Sun Goes Down" (Tom & Jame Remix) – 5:00
"Sun Goes Down" (Brooks Remix) – 4:21

Charts

Weekly charts

Year-end charts

Release history

References

2014 songs
2015 singles
David Guetta songs
Showtek songs
Magic! songs
Songs written by David Guetta
Songs written by Giorgio Tuinfort
Songs written by Nasri (musician)
Songs written by Lukas Loules
Song recordings produced by David Guetta
Songs written by Mark "Pelli" Pellizzer
Parlophone singles
Warner Music Group singles
Reggae fusion songs